Stephen Phelipe "Stevie" Forbes (born February 26, 1977) is an American professional boxer. He is a former IBF super featherweight champion. Forbes' nickname of "2 Pounds" was in recognition of the fact that he was born weighing only 2 pounds.

Amateur career
Forbes began boxing when he was 10 years old, training at the Matt Dishman Community Center on the Knott ST Boxing Team.

Professional career
Forbes turned pro in 1996 at the age of nineteen, and ran off fourteen consecutive wins to begin his career before losing on March 11, 2000 against former WBC Featherweight champion Alejandro González.

After a few comeback fights, Forbes received a shot at the United States Boxing Association Super featherweight title On September 17, 2000, Forbes faced David Santos and won the title over twelve rounds by scores of 117–111, 118–110 and 120–108.

Capturing the title
Fighting for an eighth time in 2000, the No. 2 ranked Forbes was awarded a shot at the IBF super featherweight title when Diego Corrales vacated the title to fight WBC super featherweight Champion Floyd Mayweather Jr. This allowed Forbes to face No. 1 ranked John Brown for the vacant IBF title. Forbes won the IBF belt on December 3, 2000, by an 8th round TKO of Brown. Forbes also defeated Brown in a September 29, 2001, rematch, his first title defense.  On August 18, 2002, he lost the title when he could not make weight for a fight against David Santos, whom Forbes had previously beaten for the USBA belt. The IBF title remained vacant until Forbes fought Carlos Hernández for it on October 14, 2003, a fight that Forbes lost by unanimous decision when the bout was stopped in the 10th round, due to an accidental headbutt, giving the belt to Hernandez.

The Contender
On the ESPN reality show "Contender Season 2" series debut, Forbes was chosen to be on the Gold Team. He was the favorite to win the show, by virtue of his previous success, and was the last fighter to be called out.  Forbes won his first three bouts of the series, defeating Freddy Curiel, Nick Acevedo, and Cornelius Bundrage, but he lost to Grady Brewer in the final match.

After The Contender
On March 17, 2007 he lost a  disputed, controversial decision to Demetrius Hopkins, Bernard Hopkins' nephew.

On October 6, 2007, Forbes won a split-decision upset over Francisco Bojado in a junior welterweight bout.

Forbes was defeated by Oscar De La Hoya on May 3 in Carson, California at the Home Depot Center by unanimous decision.

Professional boxing record

See also
List of super-featherweight boxing champions

References

External links

1977 births
Living people
Boxers from Portland, Oregon
American male boxers
African-American boxers
Super-featherweight boxers
Lightweight boxers
Light-welterweight boxers
Welterweight boxers
World super-featherweight boxing champions
International Boxing Federation champions
The Contender (TV series) participants